The Roman Catholic Diocese of Rio do Sul is a diocese located in the city of Rio do Sul in the Ecclesiastical province of Florianópolis in Brazil.

History
 November 23, 1968: Established as Diocese of Rio do Sul from the Metropolitan Archdiocese of Florianópolis and Diocese of Joinville

Bishops
 Bishops of Rio do Sul (Roman rite), in reverse chronological order
 Bishop Onécimo Alberton (2014.12.17 - present)
 Bishop Augustinho Petry (2008.03.19 – 2014.12.17)
 Bishop José Jovêncio Balestieri, S.D.B. (2000.08.30 – 2008.03.19)
 Bishop Tito Buss (1969.03.12 – 2000.08.30)

Coadjutor bishops
José Jovêncio Balestieri, S.D.B. (1998-2000)
Augustinho Petry (2007-2008)

References
 GCatholic.org
 Catholic Hierarchy

Roman Catholic dioceses in Brazil
Christian organizations established in 1968
Rio do Sul, Roman Catholic Diocese of
Roman Catholic dioceses and prelatures established in the 20th century